Clifford Howard Reeder (August 12, 1880 - December 1, 1961) was an American politician who served as the City of Miami's 14th and 21st Mayor.

Biography
Reeder entered into World War I on August 12, 1918. He served 10 months overseas as an Army officer and engineer and was discharged in July 1919.

Elected as a Republican, Reeder served from 1929 to 1931 and then notably again during World War II.

During his tenure as mayor, Reeder and his wife helped launch the U.S.S. Miami.

In 1942 Reeder testified before Congress in relation to inland waterways and how to improve the movement of war materials to coastal cities like Miami.

Philanthropic and civic activities
Reeder was the Commander of Miami's Harvey W Seeds American Legion Post #29 in 1924.

See also 
 List of mayors of Miami
 Government of Miami
 History of Miami

Sources

References

Mayors of Miami
People from Knoxville, Tennessee
1880 births
20th-century deaths
Year of death missing